EcoDuro, Inc. is a manufacturing, engineering and marketing company in Ann Arbor, Michigan that holds patents in the major industrial companies for its unique engineered paper pallets.  EcoDuro is a company that is focused on developing products for sustainable business practices.

EcoDuro's standard pallets weigh just 9 to 19 pounds, which us about 1/3 the weight of wood pallets that are historically used.  Lighter weight has advantages for reduced fuel consumption and reduced air and LTL (Less than Truck Load) shipping costs, as well as help with OSHA compliance. 

The EcoDuro and other paper pallets meet the IPPC regulations and are easily recycled and re-pulpable.

History

The Company was founded in 2001 with the name Excalibur Pallet Group and the patents for its engineered paper pallets issued in major industrial countries.  In 2004, the company was reformed with the name EcoDuro, Inc. with an investment from Endurance Ventures, LLC, an Ann Arbor Venture Capital Firm as its first cleantech investment.  Significant, is that it was one of the rare venture capital backed companies to be moved to Michigan as opposed to being moved from Michigan.

Originally, EcoDuro built its own manufacturing, but after the product was developed, changed its model to contract manufacturing using regional partners who already had paper honeycomb capabilities and expertise.

Manufacturing locations

Grand Rapids, Michigan

Partners

Honeycomb Products of Michigan, Manufacturing Partner
Endurance Ventures, LLC, Investment Partner
Clark Hill, Legal Counsel

Third-party testing

Michigan State University School of Packaging
Virginia Polytechnic Institute and State University

Customers

Amway
Consolidated Buscuit
GE Medical
Ocean Spray
Pfizer

External links
 

Companies based in Ann Arbor, Michigan
Companies established in 2001